Bohot Airport  is a public use airport located near Bohot, Pleven, Bulgaria.

See also
List of airports in Bulgaria

References

External links 
 Airport record for Bohot Airport at Landings.com

Airports in Bulgaria
Pleven Province